Events from the year 1857 in France.

Incumbents
 Monarch – Napoleon III

Events
3 March - France and the United Kingdom formally declare war on China in the Second Opium War.
27 April - First horse race run at Longchamp Racecourse in Paris.
21 June - Legislative election held.
5 July - Legislative election held for the second legislature of the French Second Empire.

Arts and literature
18 April - The Spirits' Book (Le Livre des Esprits in original French), one of The Five Fundamental Works of Spiritism, is published by the French educator Allan Kardec.
 The Flowers of Evil (Les Fleurs du mal in original French), an immensely influential collection of Charles Baudelaire's first poems, is published.

Births
4 January - Émile Cohl, caricaturist, cartoonist and animator (died 1938)
18 January - Eugène Gley, physiologist and endocrinologist (died 1930)
12 February - Eugène Atget, photographer (died 1927)
26 February - Émile Coué, psychologist and pharmacist (died 1926)
3 March - Alfred Bruneau, composer (died 1934)
22 March - Paul Doumer, President of France (assassinated 1932)
30 March - Léon Charles Thévenin, telegraph engineer (died 1926)
1 June - Le Pétomane (Joseph Pujol), flatulist (died 1945)
29 June - Jean-François Klobb, colonial officer (died 1899)
10 August - Georges Aaron Bénédite, Egyptologist (died 1926)

Deaths
22 February - Joseph Crétin, first Roman Catholic Bishop of Saint Paul, Minnesota (born 1799)
2 May - Alfred de Musset, dramatist, poet and novelist (born 1810)
11 May - Eugène François Vidocq, criminal, later first director of Sûreté Nationale (born 1775)
17 May - Adolphe Dureau de la Malle, geographer, naturalist, historian and artist (born 1777)
23 May - Augustin Louis Cauchy, mathematician (born 1789)
30 June - Alcide d'Orbigny, naturalist (born 1802)
29 July - Charles Lucien Bonaparte, naturalist and ornithologist (born 1803)
3 August - Eugène Sue, novelist (born 1804)
5 September - Auguste Comte, philosopher (born 1798)
28 October - Louis-Eugène Cavaignac, General (born 1802)
23 December - Achille Devéria, painter and lithographer (born 1800)

References

1850s in France